Agdistis bifurcatus is a moth in the family Pterophoridae. It is known from Cape Verde, the Canary Islands, Morocco, Tunisia, the Selvagens Islands, Spain and Portugal.

The larvae feed on Limonium species, including Limonium ferulaceum.

References

Agdistinae
Plume moths of Africa
Moths of Cape Verde
Moths of Africa
Moths of Europe
Fauna of the Canary Islands
Moths described in 1952